Baril may refer to:

Adrian Baril
Céline Baril (born 1953), Canadian artist and film director
Maurice Baril
Robert Baril
Baril, Yemen